A powder burn is a type of burn caused by exposure to the combustion gases which are expelled from the muzzle of a firearm as it is fired. Powder burns only occur when the individual is in close proximity to the discharging firearm, as the gases quickly dissipate. This can be an indicator on a corpse of whether the person was shot at point-blank range or not.

References 

Burns
Gunpowder